Australasian Palaeontological Memoirs (formerly Memoirs of the Association of Australasian Palaeontologists) is a peer-reviewed scientific monographic series covering all aspects of palaeontology in the Australasian region. The memoir series is designed for longer monographic treatments, but will also consider thematic sets of papers and commonly publishes conference proceedings.

History
The memoirs were initiated in 1983 as the Memoirs of the Association of Australasian Palaeontologists as a monographic series published by AAP. In 2015 their series title was changed to Australasian Palaeontological Memoirs.
It is published directly through the Association of Australasian Palaeontologists.

Notes

External links

Paleontology journals
Monographic series
Taylor & Francis academic journals
Publications established in 1983
English-language journals
Irregular journals